ROC La Voulte-Valence (French: Rhône ovalie club La Voulte-Valence) is a French rugby union club based in Valence, Drôme and playing home matches in Valence and La Voulte-sur-Rhône in the adjacent department of Ardèche. The team currently competes in Fédérale 1, the third division of French rugby.

The club was established in 2010 by a merger of Valence Sportif, founded in 1905, and La Voulte Sportif, founded in 1907. Its main stadium is Valence's former ground of Stade Georges-Pompidou, with La Voulte's former home of Stade Battandier-Lukowiak as a secondary home. They play in black and white.

Honours
 Première Division (now Top 14):
 Champions: 1970 (La Voulte)
 Deuxième Division (now Pro D2):
 Runners-up: 1935 (Valence), 1951 (La Voulte), 1962 (Valence)
 Challenge de l'Espérance:
 Champion: 1962 (La Voulte), 1963 (La Voulte), 1987 (Valence)
 Champion: 1964 (La Voulte), 1977 (Valence), 1984 (Valence)
 Challenge Jules Cadenat:
 Champion: 1976 (Valence)

2016-17

Famous players
Élie Cester (Valence)
Sébastien Chabal (Valence)
Gerard Rousset (Valence)

See also
 List of rugby union clubs in France

External links
Official site

La Voulte Valence
Sport in Drôme
Valence, Drôme
Rugby clubs established in 2010
2010 establishments in France
Sport in Ardèche